Wallace Duncan Smith Scobie (born 31 January 1934) is a retired amateur Scottish football right back who played in the Scottish League for Queen's Park. He was capped by Scotland at amateur level.

References 

Scottish footballers
Scottish Football League players
Queen's Park F.C. players
Association football outside forwards
Scotland amateur international footballers
1934 births
Footballers from Paisley, Renfrewshire
Living people